EHF may refer to:

Science and technology

 Ebola hemorrhagic fever or Ebola virus disease, a disease of humans and other primates caused by ebolaviruses
 EHF (gene), ETS homologous factor, a human gene
 Extended Hunk Format, a version of the Amiga Hunk executable file format
 Extremely high frequency, a radio frequency band

Organizations
 Eastern Hockey Federation, an independent American youth minor ice hockey league
 European Handball Federation, the European governing body for handball
 European Hockey Federation, an umbrella association for field hockey
 European Humanist Federation, an association of humanist organizations

Other 

 Einkahlutafélag (ehf.), a form of private company in Iceland